Tourula is a district of Jyväskylä, Finland, and a part of the Kantakaupunki ward. It is located near to the Jyväskylä downtown and separated from it by the river Tourujoki.

Tourula was a residential area for working class, made of wooden single-family houses which were built in the 1910s and 1920s. The area was merged into Jyväskylä in 1941, and after that the wooden houses started to decay and they were torn down during the 1970s and 1980s. After that, the appearance of Tourula changed radically.

Gallery

References 

Neighbourhoods of Jyväskylä